The anovulatory cycle is a menstrual cycle by varying degrees of menstrual intervals and the absence of ovulation and a luteal phase. In the absence of ovulation, there will be infertility.

Patterns
While the normal menstrual cycle in the human typically lasts 4 weeks (28 days, range 24–35 days) and consists of a follicular phase, ovulation, and a luteal phase, followed by either menstruation or pregnancy, the anovulatory cycle has cycle
lengths of varying degrees. In many circumstances, menstrual intervals are prolonged exceeding 35 days leading to oligomenorrhea (cycle >35 – 180 days interval), or even longer, amenorrhea. In other cases, menstruation may be fairly regular (eumenorrhea), or more frequent (intervals < 21 days), or there may be a loss of menstrual pattern (menorrhagia, dysfunctional uterine bleeding).

Estrogen breakthrough bleeding
Normal menstrual bleeding in the ovulatory cycle is a result of a decline in progesterone due to the demise of the corpus luteum. It is thus a progesterone withdrawal bleeding. As there is no progesterone in the anovulatory cycle, bleeding is caused by the inability of estrogen—that needs to be present to stimulate the endometrium in the first place—to support a growing endometrium. Anovulatory bleeding is hence termed 'estrogen breakthrough bleeding'.

Risks
Anemia
Bone density loss
Endometrial cancer
Infertility

Diagnosis
A physician needs to investigate the cause of anovulation. Common causes are:
Polycystic ovary syndrome
Hypothalamic dysfunction
Perimenopause
Ovulatory dysfunction
Thyroid disorders
Hyperprolactinemia
Eating disorders, dieting or other disordered eating
Female athlete triad

With excessive or prolonged bleeding the diagnosis has to be made by a physician on a speedy basis. Other causes of gynecological bleeding need to be excluded, specifically bleeding related to pregnancy, leiomyoma, and cancer of the cervix or uterus.

Management
Women who do not ovulate and who want to get pregnant need a medical work-up to find out why they do not ovulate. Drugs are often given to induce ovulation, including oral medication such as  clomiphene or injectable medications.
In patients who do not want to get pregnant anovulation can be managed with the use of cyclic progesterone or progestin supplementation or use of hormonal contraception.

See also
Menstrual cycle
Ovulation
Anovulation

Notes

Mammal female reproductive system